Chon often refers to Chonan languages.

 Chon may also refer to:

Places
 Heaven Lake, also known as Lake Chon
 Loch Chon, a loch named Chon
 Water of Chon, a waterway connected to Loch Chon

Other uses
 CHON, a mnemonic acronym for the four most common elements in living organisms
 Chon (album), 2019 self-titled album by Chon (band)
 Chon (band), an American progressive rock band
 Chon (name), a given name or surname
 CHON-FM, a radio station (98.1 FM) licensed to Whitehorse, Yukon, Canada
 Kopi luwak (Vietnamese: cà phê Chồn; aka Chồn Coffee), a type of coffee
 Korean won (Chŏn), a currency used in North and South Korea

See also

 
 
 Chons, the Ancient Egyptian god of the Moon
 Sympistis chons (S. chons) a species of moth
 Chonchon (disambiguation)